The 2017–18 North Dakota Fighting Hawks women's basketball team represents the University of North Dakota during the 2017–18 NCAA Division I women's basketball season. The Fighting Hawks were led by sixth year head coach Travis Brewster and play their home games at the Betty Engelstad Sioux Center. They were members of the Big Sky Conference. They finished the season 12–18, 5–13 in Big Sky play to finish in a tie for ninth place. They lost in the first round of the Big Sky women's tournament to Montana State.

This season was the last for North Dakota as a full Big Sky member. On July 1, 2018, the school will join the Summit League in all sports except for football, in which it will remain a Big Sky member before joining the Missouri Valley Football Conference in 2020.

Roster

Schedule

|-
!colspan=9 style="background:#; color:#000000;"| Exhibition

|-
!colspan=9 style="background:#; color:#000000;"| Non-conference regular season

|-
!colspan=9 style="background:#; color:#000000;"| Big Sky regular season

|-
!colspan=9 style="background:#; color:#000000;"| Big Sky tournament

See also
2017–18 North Dakota Fighting Hawks men's basketball team

References

North Dakota Fighting Hawks women's basketball seasons
North Dakota